Persianization or Persification, is a sociological process of cultural change in which a non-Persian society becomes "Persianate", meaning it either directly adopts or becomes strongly influenced by the Persian language, culture, literature, art, music, and identity as well as other socio-cultural factors. It is a specific form of cultural assimilation that often includes a language shift. The term applies not only to cultures, but also to individuals, as they acclimate to Persian culture and become "Persianized" or "Persified".

Historically, the term was commonly applied to refer to changes in the cultures of non-Iranian peoples living within the Persian cultural sphere, particularly during the early and middle Islamic periods, such as Arabs and various Caucasian (such as Georgian, Armenian and Dagestani) and Turkic peoples, including the Seljuks, the Ottomans, and the Ghaznavids. The term has also been applied to the transmission of aspects of Persian culture, including language, to the non-Persian peoples in the regions surrounding Iran (also known as Persia), such as Anatolia and South Asia.

History

Pre-Islamic period
Unlike the Ancient Greeks and the Roman Empire, the ancient Persian Achaemenid Empire was not concerned with spreading its culture to the many peoples that it conquered.  Arguably, the first recorded episode of persianization dates back to Alexander the Great, who, after conquering the Persian Empire in the 4th century BCE, adopted Persian dress, customs and court mannerisms; married a Persian princess, Stateira II and made subjects cast themselves on their faces when approaching him, in Persian-style, known to Greeks as the custom of proskynesis, a symbolic kissing of the hand that Persians paid to their social superiors. Persian dress and practices were also observed by Peucestas, who was later made satrap of Persis, where he conciliated the favour of the Persians to his rule in exchange for those of the Macedonians.

Early Islamic period to 15th century

After the fall of the Sasanian dynasty in 651, the Umayyad Arabs adopted many of the Persian customs, especially the administrative and the court mannerisms. Arab provincial governors were either persianized Arameans or ethnic Persians; certainly, Persian remained the language of official business of the caliphate until the adoption of Arabic toward the end of the 7th century, when, in 692, minting began at the caliphal capital, Damascus. The new Islamic coins evolved from imitations of Sasanian and Byzantine coins, and the Pahlavi script on the coinage was replaced with Arabic.

The Abbasids, after 750, established their capital in what is now Iraq, eventually at Baghdad. A shift in orientation toward the east is discernible, which was encouraged by increased receptiveness to Persian cultural influence and the roots of the Abbasid revolution in Khorasan, now in Afghanistan A proverb complained about the Persianization of morals by Turks.

16th to 18th centuries
Two major powers in West Asia rose, the Persian Safavids and Ottoman Turks. The Safavids reasserted Persian culture and hegemony over South Caucasus, Eastern Anatolia, Mesopotamia and other regions. Many khans, begs and other rulers adopted Persian customs and clothing and patronized Persian culture. They founded the city of Derbent in the North Caucasus (now in Dagestan, Russia). Many ethnic peoples adopted many aspects of Persian culture and contributed to their persianization.

Modern era

In modern times, the term is often used in connection with non-Persian speakers like the Azeris and the Kurds.

It has been argued that modern Iranian nationalism was established during the Pahlavi era and was based on the aim of forming a modern nation-state. What is often neglected is that Iranian nationalism has its roots before the Pahlavi, in the early 20th century. On the eve of World War I, Pan-Turkist propaganda focused on the Turkic-speaking lands of Iran, the Caucasus and Central Asia.  The ultimate purpose of persuading these populations to secede from the larger political entities to which they belonged and to join the new pan-Turkic homeland.  It was the latter appeal to Iranian Azerbaijanis, which contrary to Pan-Turkist intentions, caused a small group of Azerbaijani intellectuals to become the strongest advocates of the territorial integrity of Iran.  After the constitutional revolution in Iran, a romantic nationalism was adopted by Azerbaijani Democrats as a reaction to the pan-Turkist irredentist policies emanating from modern Turkey and threatening Iran's territorial integrity.  It was during this period that Iranism and linguistic homogenization policies were proposed as a defensive nature against all others.  Contrary to what one might expect, foremost among innovating this defensive nationalism were Iranian Azerbaijanis.  They viewed that assuring the territorial integrity of the country was the first step in building a society based on law and modern state.  Through this framework, their political loyalty outweighed their ethnic and regional affiliations.  The adoptions of this integrationist policies paved the way for the emergence of the titular ethnic group's cultural nationalism.

According to Tadeusz Swietochowski, in 1930s, the term was used to describe the official policy pursued by Reza Shah Pahlavi to assimilate the ethnic minorities in Iran (Iranians as well as Non-Iranians). In particular, within this policy the Azerbaijani language was banned for use on the premises of schools, in theatrical performances, religious ceremonies and in the publication of books. Swietochowski writes:

Mughal Empire
The Mughal Empire was an Islamic imperial power that ruled a large portion of the Indian Subcontinent and Afghanistan in South Asia. From 1526, the Mughals invaded the Indian Subcontinent, from their initial base in Kabul, and they eventually ruled most of Hindustan (South Asia) by the late 17th and the early 18th centuries until the mid-19th century. The emperors were descendants of the Timurids who had embraced Persian culture, converted to Islam and resided in Turkestan, and they were the ones responsible for the spread of Persian and Islamic culture to Central Asia. At the height of their power around 1700, they controlled most of the Indian Subcontinent and Afghanistan and spread Persian culture throughout, just as their predecessors the Turkic Ghaznavids and the Turko-Afghan Delhi Sultanate had done. In general, from its earliest days, Persian culture and language was spread in South Asia by various Persianised Central Asian Turkic and Afghan dynasties.

Babur, the founder of the Mughal Empire, identified his lineage as Timurid and Chagatai Turkic, and his origin, milieu, training and culture were Persian culture. He was largely responsible for the fostering of the culture by his descendants and for the expansion of Persian cultural influence in the Indian Subcontinent (and Afghanistan), with brilliant literary, artistic and historiographical results. Many works of art such as the Taj Mahal, Humayun's Tomb and the Badshahi Mosque are of Persian Islamic architecture, with Persian names. Persian was the official language of the Mughal courts.

By country

Afghanistan
By 1964, the Afghanistan Constitution cited Dari as one of its two official languages alongside Pashto. Although the latter is the designated national language, Dari remains the lingua franca.
There are modern initiatives that attempt to "Pashto-ize" all governmental communication. Since Dari is the language of the bureaucracy, Persian-speaking Afghans dominated it. Persianization is especially seen in the case of the "Kabulis", the long-established families from Kabul (usually Pashtuns completely immersed in Persian culture).
Persianization is also reinforced by the incidence of urbanization in the country, which influenced the characteristics of the Afghan ethnic groups. The two most significant ethnic groups in Afghanistan are the Pashtuns, who are speakers of the Pashto language, and the Tajiks, who are Persian speakers. While Pashtuns dominated the country since they constitute the majority of the Afghan population, Persian culture still permeated. In the early history of Afghanistan as an independent country, many Pashtuns moved into urbanized areas and adopted Dari as their language. As a result, many ethnic Pashtuns in Afghanistan identify themselves as Tajiks but still have Pashtun names (such as a last name with the suffix "-zai") simply because they speak Dari and are assimilated into Tajiki culture in the country within a process known as "de-tribalization".

India 

Medieval India during the Mughal Empire was heavily influenced by the Persian language and culture. The resulting Indo-Persian culture produced poets, such as Amir Khusrau. The influence of Persian on Old Hindi led to the development of the Urdu language, which in the present-day is an official language of India, also having official status in certain Indian states and territories, such as Uttar Pradesh, Bihar, Jharkhand, Delhi, Telangana and West Bengal.

Tajikistan 
In March 2007, the Tajik President changed his surname to from Rakhmonov to Rahmon, getting rid of the Russian "-ov" ending. and removed his patronymic of Sharipovich out of respect for Tajik culture. Following the move, a large number governments officials and civil servants Tajikified their own names. In April 2016, this practice became officially mandated by law.

Pakistan
Urdu, the national language of Pakistan, is an Indo-Aryan language that has been historically influenced by Persian. Various languages spoken in Pakistan from the Indo-Aryan language family as well as the Iranian language family have also been influenced by Persian, itself a Western Iranian language. The Pakistani national anthem, Qaumi Taranah, is written almost entirely in Persian. The name "Pakistan", with both Pak and the place-name suffix of -stan, are drawn directly from the Persian language. These modern linguistic developments are rooted primarily in the rule of various Indo-Islamic dynasties on the Indian subcontinent, most notably the Mughals, who established Persian and later Urdu as official and court languages across the region.

The presence of Iranian peoples such as the Pashtuns and the Baloch people in western Pakistan has solidified Persianate culture in the country; this presence was further boosted following the influx of Afghan refugees into Pakistan as a consequence of the Afghanistan conflict.

See also
Turco-Persian tradition
Iranian peoples
Persians

References

Cultural assimilation
Persian culture